Knut Hilding Fridell (8 September 1908 – 3 February 1992) was a Swedish light-heavyweight freestyle wrestler. He won gold medals at the 1934 European Championships and 1936 Summer Olympics.

References

Olympic wrestlers of Sweden
Wrestlers at the 1936 Summer Olympics
Swedish male sport wrestlers
Olympic gold medalists for Sweden
1908 births
1992 deaths
Olympic medalists in wrestling
Medalists at the 1936 Summer Olympics
People from Uddevalla Municipality
Sportspeople from Västra Götaland County
20th-century Swedish people